, the Rome Metro comprises three lines – A, B, and C – which together serve a total of 73 stations (counting Termini, the interchange station between Lines A and B, and San Giovanni, the interchange station between Lines A and C, only once) as listed below.

Line A (orange)

Line A serves a total of 27 stations (including one interchange with Line B and another with Line C), most of which opened in 1980 (five stations opened in 1999 and 2000):

Line B (blue)

Line B serves a total of 26 stations (including one interchange with Line A), on two branch lines (with 15 stations on the common section of both branch lines):

Line C (green)

, Line C serves a total of 22 stations (including one interchange with Line A), all of which opened in 2014, 2015 and 2018; two additional stations (including an interchange with Line B) are under construction:

Rome
!
Railway stations in Rome
Rome Metro stations
Rome
Metro